Pedino may refer to the following places in Greece:

Pedino, Florina, a village in the Florina regional unit, part of the municipality Amyntaio
Pedino, Kilkis, a village in the Kilkis regional unit
Pedino, Lemnos, a village in the island of Lemnos
Pedino, Lesvos, a village in the island of Lesvos